Wedding party massacre may refer to:

 Mukaradeeb wedding party massacre, a shooting and bombing attack by American troops in Iraq
 Nadahan wedding bombing, a suicide bomb attack in Afghanistan 
 Wech Baghtu wedding party airstrike, a shooting and bombing attack by coalition troops in Afghanistan
 Haska Meyna wedding party airstrike, 47 mostly women and children including the bride killed during a U.S. airstrike in Afghanistan